The 1977 Swedish Grand Prix was a Formula One motor race held at the Scandinavian Raceway on 19 June 1977. It was the eighth race of the 1977 Formula One season.

The 72-lap race was won by Frenchman Jacques Laffite, driving a Ligier-Matra. This was the first Formula One victory for a French team and a French engine, as well as the first all-French victory in the Formula One World Championship.

German driver Jochen Mass finished second in a McLaren-Ford, with Argentinian Carlos Reutemann third in a Ferrari.

Report
The Swedish race was full of anticipation after Gunnar Nilsson's win last time out, but once again in qualifying, it was his teammate Mario Andretti leading the way from John Watson, with James Hunt heading the second row. 

At the start of the race, Watson led into the first corner, followed by Jody Scheckter. Soon, however, Andretti passed both of them and opened up a lead. Watson and Scheckter battled for second until they collided, forcing Scheckter to retire and Watson to have to pit for repairs. James Hunt, who was now in second, began to drop back; he was passed by a charging Jacques Laffite and his teammate, Jochen Mass.

Andretti's dominance ended after a fuel metering problem Andretti, however, was dominant until he had to pit due to a fuel metering problem with two laps left. In doing so, he handed the lead to Laffite, who went on to take his first ever Formula One victory ahead of Mass and Carlos Reutemann.

Laffite's victory in his Gitanes-sponsored Ligier-Matra marked the first all-French victory in World Championship history.

Classification

Qualifying

Race

Championship standings after the race

Drivers' Championship standings

Constructors' Championship standings

Notes

References

Swedish Grand Prix
Swedish Grand Prix
Grand Prix
June 1977 sports events in Europe